Alexandre Rousselet (born 29 January 1977) is a French cross-country skier who has competed since 1998. His best individual finish at the Winter Olympics was 19th in the 15 km event at Turin in 2006.

Rousselet's best finish at the FIS Nordic World Ski Championships was fifth in the 4 × 10 km relay at Sapporo in 2007 while his best individual finish was 25th in the 15 km event in 2005.

His best individual career finish was fourth in a 15 km + 15 km double pursuit FIS race in France in 2006 while his best individual World Cup finish was eighth in a 30 km event in Italy, also in 2006.

Rousselet was born in Pontarlier, Doubs.

Cross-country skiing results
All results are sourced from the International Ski Federation (FIS).

Olympic Games

World Championships

World Cup

Season standings

Team podiums
 1 victory – (1 ) 
 4 podiums – (4 )

References

External links

1977 births
Living people
People from Pontarlier
Cross-country skiers at the 2002 Winter Olympics
Cross-country skiers at the 2006 Winter Olympics
French male cross-country skiers
Olympic cross-country skiers of France
Sportspeople from Doubs
20th-century French people
21st-century French people